Tornike Eristavi also known as John Tornikios (died in 985) was a retired Georgian general and monk who came to be better known as a founder of the formerly Georgian Orthodox Iviron Monastery on Mount Athos in the modern-day northeastern Greece.

Life
Tornike came from a notable Georgian noble family and was in the immediate circles of the ruling dynasty of the Bagrationi. His father, Chordvaneli, had been in the suite of the Georgian prince Ashot II Kuropalates who had paid a visit to the Byzantine emperor Constantine Porphyrogennetos in Constantinople in c. 950. Three of his nephews had military careers and one of them, Varazvache, held a post of katepano (military governor) of the significant Byzantine eastern outpost Edessa in 1037–8.

Tornike served a very successful military and court career (specifically he was eristavi, a Georgian equivalent to strategos) under the Georgian Bagratid dynasty and also gained the Byzantine title of patrikios. He resigned his position as a general of the Georgian prince David III of Tao in c. 963 and, under the name of Ioane (Ioannis, or John), retired to Athanasius’ Lavra on Mount Athos. He was joined, in the early 970s, by another retired Georgian officer Ioane and his son Ek'vt'ime.

In 976, a rebellion led by Bardas Skleros broke out in the Asian provinces of the Byzantine Empire, the greatest upheaval of the emperor Basil II’s early reign. Skleros had won a series of battles against the then-loyal general Bardas Phokas and marched from the east through Anatolia to Constantinople. Basil summoned John-Tornike to his capital to mediate the alliance with David III of Tao, a measure that seemed to be necessary to save the situation. The monk agreed reluctantly, persuaded chiefly by his fellow monks that it would be in the best interests of the Athonite community for him to obey the imperial command. David responded vigorously and entrusted his former general the command of some 12,000 Georgian cavalrymen sent to reinforce the imperial army. The decisive battle was fought at Pankalia near Caesarea on March 24, 979 and resulted in the crushing defeat of the rebels.

Founding of Iviron monastery
In reward for their support, David was awarded with the lifetime stewardship of the extensive lands in northeastern Anatolia, while John-Tornike was conferred with the title synkellos (assistant to the patriarch of Constantinople). More importantly, the victorious monk-general returned to Athos laden with the spoils of war, "precious objects" as well as twelve kentenaria (1,200 lb) of gold, that enabled the Georgians to establish their own house on Athos, called Iviron. Although populated now with Greeks, the monastery is to this day known by the Greek appellation Iviron, "of the Iberians", i.e., Georgians. The emperor also showered him with lands and privileges, granted him subsidies and exemption from taxes. The new monastic house, destined to become a vibrant center of the Georgian Orthodox culture, was jointly run by John-Tornike as ktetor (founder) and his friend John the Iberian as hegoumenos (abbot).

References 
 

Morris, R. (2002), Monks and Laymen in Byzantium, 843–1118, Cambridge University Press (UK), pp 85–6
Peelers P. Un Colophon georgien de Thornik le moine // Analecta Bollandiana, 1932–50
ბოგვერაძე ა., ქსე, ტ. 4, გვ. 695, თბ., 1979
გიორგი მთაწმიდელი, ცხორებაი იოვანესი და ეფთვიმესი, ძველი ქართული აგიოგრაფიული ლიტერატურის ძეგლები, II, ილია აბულაძის რედაქტორობით, თბილისი, 1967;
მატიანე ქართლისაი, ქართლის ცხოვრება, I, ს. ყაუხჩიშვილის რედაქტორობით. თბილისი, 1955;
სუმბატ დავითის ძის ქრონიკა ტაო-კლარჯეთის ბაგრატიონთა შესახებ, ე. თაყაიშვილის გამოცემა/მასალები საქართველოსა და კავკასიის ისტორიისათვის. ნაკვ. 27, თბილისი, 1949;
ბატონიშვილი ვახუშტი, აღწერა სამეფოსა საქართველოსა, ქართლის ცხოვრება,  IV, ს. ყაუხჩიშვილის გამოცემა, თბილისი, 1973;
თ. ჟორდანია, ქრონიკები, I, 1893;
გეორგიკა. ბიზანტიელი მწერლების ცნობები საქართველოს შესახებ, ს. ყაუხჩიშვილის გამოცემა, IV -V, თბილისი,  1963;  VI, 1966; Анна Комнина. «Алексиада».1965 г.
სუმბატ სპარაპეტი. ჟამთააღმწერლობა, ერევანი, 1954 (სომხურ ენაზე).
ივ. ჯავახიშვილი, ქართველი ერის ისტორია, II. თბილისი, 1948;
ნ. ბერძენიშვილი, ივ. ჯავახიშვილი, ს. ჯანაშია, საქართველოს ისტორია, ნაწილი I, 1948;
ე. მეტრეველი, ნარკვევები ათონის კულტურულ-საგანმანათლებლო კერის ისტორიიდან, თბილისი, 1996;
ც. ქურციკიძე, ათონზე გადაწერილი ერთი ხელნაწერის შესახებ, კრებული “მწიგნობარი” თბილისი, 1980;
ე. ცაგარეიშვილი, ზოგი რამ დავით კურაპალატის სახელმწიფოებრივ-პოლიტიკური მოღვაწეობის შესახებ, “მრავალტავი”, XX, თბილისი, 2003;
Православная энциклопедия. Под редакцией патриарха Московского и всея Руси Алексея II. т.III,  Москва, 2001;
Н. Ломоури. К истории восстания Варды Склира, თსუ შრომები #67
С.Н. Джанашия, Об одном примере искажения исторической правды, Тб. 1947

External links
 Greek Monasteries, URL accessed on June 16, 2006

985 deaths
Military personnel from Georgia (country)
Nobility of Georgia (country)
Saints of Georgia (country)
Eastern Orthodox Christians from Georgia (country)
10th-century people from Georgia (country)
Christian monks from Georgia (country)
10th-century Christian saints
Byzantine people of Georgian descent
Patricii
Year of birth unknown
Tornikios family
Founders of Christian monasteries
People associated with Iviron Monastery